Victor Gbolahan Makanju (born 22 March 1985) is a Nigerian badminton player.

Achievements

All African  Games 
Men's doubles

African Championships
Men's singles

Men's doubles

BWF International Challenge/Series
Men's doubles

 BWF International Challenge tournament
 BWF International Series tournament
 BWF Future Series tournament

References

External links 
 

Living people
1985 births
Nigerian male badminton players
Competitors at the 2011 All-Africa Games
Competitors at the 2015 African Games
African Games gold medalists for Nigeria
African Games bronze medalists for Nigeria
African Games medalists in badminton
21st-century Nigerian people